Disney's Herbie: Rescue Rally is a racing video game for the Nintendo DS, developed by Climax Handheld Games and published by Disney Interactive Studios. It is based on Disney's Herbie film series.

Overview 
Despite the game releasing two years after Disney's Herbie: Fully Loaded film and its tie-in videogame, Rescue Rally features a new plot with different characters. Herbie and Louise Noble must win back her family's animal sanctuary from Edward Vile by competing in a cross state race and winning one million dollars.

Similar to other racing videogames such as Mario Kart, the gameplay consists of driving into speedboosts and power-ups. The game contains four racetracks, a Story mode, as well as a Multiplayer mode via Multi-Card Play.

Reception
IGN gave the game a 7.3/10, stating that "it feels weird to say that Herbie Rescue Rally is a good game. For a system that is seriously lacking in solid racing titles, it's refreshing to find one that is at least worth playing."

References

External links

2007 video games
Racing video games
Video games based on films
Nintendo DS games
Nintendo DS-only games
Video games developed in the United Kingdom